The Carr ministry (1999–2003) or Third Carr ministry was the 87th ministry of the New South Wales Government, and was led by the 39th Premier of New South Wales, Bob Carr, representing the Labor Party.

The ministry covered the period from 8 April 1999, when Carr led Labor to victory at the 1999 state election, until 3 April 2003, when Carr's Labor government was re-elected at the 2003 state election.
As of 2021 this is the last term of Parliament in which the elected Premier of New South Wales has served the full term.

Composition of ministry
The ministry was announced on 8 April 1999 and two new roles were created in March 2000. In June 2000 Jeff Shaw resigned from parliament to be appointed a judge of the Supreme Court, resulting in a reconfiguration of the ministry. Having spent more than five years as the Minister for the Olympics organising the Sydney Olympics in September 2000, Michael Knight retired from parliament in January 2001. In November 2001 Paul Whelan resigned from the ministry. The fourth re-arrangement occurred in July 2002, when Faye Lo Po' retired from the ministry. Richard Face had announced that he would not contest the 2003 election and retired from the ministry in February 2003. The ministry was replaced by the Fourth Carr ministry following the 2003 election.

 
Ministers are members of the Legislative Assembly unless otherwise noted.

See also

 Members of the New South Wales Legislative Assembly, 1999–2003
Members of the New South Wales Legislative Council, 1999–2003

Notes

References

 

! colspan="3" style="border-top: 5px solid #cccccc" | New South Wales government ministries

New South Wales ministries
1999 establishments in Australia
2003 disestablishments in Australia
Australian Labor Party ministries in New South Wales